The Guianan schiffornis or olivaceous schiffornis (Schiffornis olivacea), is a species of Neotropical bird.

Distribution and habitat
It is found from southeast Venezuela to Guyana and north central Brazil.  Its natural habitats are subtropical or tropical moist lowland forests and subtropical or tropical moist montane forests.

Description
It is medium-sized, about 24 cm (9 in.) long.

Taxonomy
The Guianan schiffornis has traditionally been placed in the manakin family, but evidence strongly suggest it is better placed in Tityridae, where now placed by SACC.

The species was split by the AOU in 2013 from the species complex thrush-like schiffornis.

References

Guianan schiffornis
Birds of the Guianas
Guianan schiffornis
Taxa named by Robert Ridgway